Shirley Zwerus, stage name Shirley (Zandvoort, 22 May 1946) is a Dutch singer and pianist. Her records were released internationally on Fontana Records from 1969.

Discography

Albums
 1978: Makin’ Love Is Good for You (als Shirley Zwerus) 
Have You Ever Seen the Rain / Makin’ Love Is Good for You / The Light I Wanna Be / Save a Little for the Morning / The Next Time // A Bad Case of Rock ’n’ Roll / Fool, Fool / Love Has Tied Our Hearts Together / Giving It Up for Love / Don't Cry Out Loud
 1981: Shirley
Bij jou / Eerste liefde vergeet je nooit / Bloemen bloeien zelfs als het koud is / Jij maakt me so blij / Het is voorbij // Heel even / Oh, het is waar / Nu ik jou niet heb / Dromen van een ander / Zonder woorden

Singles
 1958: Maar ondanks dat (Ben jij m’n lieve schat) / Mambo Olé (als Duo Godert en Shirley)
 1959: Teenager Melody / Jolly Joker (NL #14) (als Shirley and her Rhythms Stars)
 1959: Vakantie in Honolulu / Mijn Daddy
 1961: Blue Moon / Besame mucho
 1961: Spaar me / Wat zou je doen? (B-Seite von Joop van der Marel & Het Leedy Trio)
 1962: Ya-Ya / Shadows of the Past
 1963: Zeven witte meeuwen / Mooi zijn de nachten op Ikaria (unter dem Pseudonym Rosemarie)
 1963: Cimeroni / Toen kwam Johnny
 1963: Verliefd, verloofd en dan getrouwd / Blondie (Shirley en Tony Ronald)
 1963: Ich wollt’ ich wär’ Prinzessin / Wer wird der erste sein
 1964: Ik ga weg / Huil toch om de liefde niet
 1964: Bitte geh’ / Meinen Mann such’ ich mir selbst aus
 1964: Vergessen (Remember) / Es war einmal 
 1964: You’re My World / Who Knows Why
 1965: Nimm den Kuß als Souvenir / Georgia
 1965: In Swing and Sweet (EP): Hands Off Him – Misty Moonray / Lost and Lookin’
 1966: Ik wist allang (dat jij zou komen) (Çe soir je t’attendais) / Georgia
 1966: Bach bijvoorbeeld / Het orgelconcert
 1967: No More Love for Me / I Come Another Step Closer to Your Heart (Robert Dahl & Shirley)
 1967: Big Boss Man / I’m an Evil Gal (Single-Titel: Shirley Goes Soul)
 1968: Anatole / Ev’ry day
 1968: That’s Why I Die a Little / Save the Last Dance for Me
 1970: Fantasy in Fiction / Love Her in the Car (B-Seite von Corner Act ’68; beide Titel aus dem Film Fantasy in Fiction)
 1971: Amsterdam... het blijft een gezellige stad / Doe ’t met je neus (A: Shirley met leden van het Amsterdams Toneel / B: Shirley & John Brands)
 1977: It’s Me / I Will Love You (NL #13)
 1978: Nothing Has Changed / Take Me
 1978: Persil: Een nieuw geluid (Werbe-Flexidisc) 
 1978: The Light I Wanna Be / Makin’ Love Is Good for You (als Shirley Zwerus)
 1979: What a Lovely Day / What a Lovely Dub (A-Seite: Errol & Shirley, B-Seite: Errol Ross Orchestra plus vocals Shirley & Errol)
 1980: Easy Livin’/It's the Only Way / Theme from ‚You're My Future‘ (instr.) (als Shirley Zwerus)
 1981: Heel even / I'm Sorry (NL #24)
 1981: Bij jou / Oh, het is waar
 1981: Eerste liefde vergeet je nooit / Jij maakt me zo blij
 1982: Een kind, een kind / De jaren van je jeugd (Charity-Single von Lenny, Bonnie, Dimitri, Shirley, Willem & Alexander)
 1983: The Way Old Friends Do / One and Only
 1995: Heel even (neue Version) / Soms (If I Have to Go Away) (von Gerard Joling & Shirley Zwerus)
 1996: Wil je me soms kwijt / Wil je me soms kwijt (instrumentaal)

References

1946 births
Living people
Dutch women singers
Dutch pop singers
People from Zandvoort